The 2021–22 season is Levski Sofia's 101st season in the First League. This article shows player statistics and all matches (official and friendly) that the club will play during the season.

This season marked the end of a 13-year trophy drought with Levski winning the 2021–22 Bulgarian Cup.

Transfers

In

Out

Loans out

Squad

Updated on 7 April 2022.

Performance overview

Fixtures

Friendlies

Summer

Mid-season

Winter

First League

Preliminary stage

League table

Results summary

Results by round

Matches

Championship round

League table

Results summary

Results by round

Matches

Bulgarian Cup

Squad statistics

|-
|colspan="14"|Players away from the club on loan:

|-
|colspan="14"|Players who left the club during the season:

|}

Disciplinary record
Includes all competitive matches.

References 
General
 Official club website

Specific

Notes 

PFC Levski Sofia seasons
Levski Sofia